The 2000 Sydney to Hobart Yacht Race, sponsored by Telstra, was the 56th annual running of the "blue water classic" Sydney to Hobart Yacht Race. As in past editions of the race, it was hosted by the Cruising Yacht Club of Australia based in Sydney, New South Wales.  As with previous Sydney to Hobart Yacht Races, the 2000 edition began on Sydney Harbour, at noon on Boxing Day (26 December 2000), before heading south for 630 nautical miles (1,170 km) through the Tasman Sea, past Bass Strait, into Storm Bay and up the River Derwent, to cross the finish line in Hobart, Tasmania. 

The 2000 fleet comprised 82 starters of which 58 completed the race and 24 yachts retired.

Results

Line Honours results (Top 10)

Handicap Results (Top 10)

References

Sydney to Hobart Yacht Race
S
2000 in Australian sport
December 2000 sports events in Australia
January 2001 sports events in Australia